Han Sang-hyeok is a South Korean voice actor who joined the Munhwa Broadcasting Corporation's voice acting division in 1970. He later became chairman of the Korea Communications Commission.

Roles

Broadcast TV
Slayers (Korea TV Edition, SBS)  
Slayers TRY (Korea TV Edition, SBS)  
Mega Ranger (Korea TV Edition, SBS)  
Nadia: The Secret of Blue Water (Korea TV Edition, MBC)  
Olympus Guardian (SBS) -  Cronus
Tecaman (Korea TV Edition, SBS)  
Rushman (Korea TV Edition, MBC)  
Tai's Adventure (Korea TV Edition, SBS)  
The Powerpuff Girls (Korea TV Edition, SBS) - Mojo Jojo

See also
Munhwa Broadcasting Corporation
MBC Voice Acting Division

References

External links
MBC Voice Acting Division Han Sang Hyeok Blog

Year of birth missing (living people)
Living people
South Korean male voice actors